Valérie André (born 21 April 1922) is a veteran of the French Resistance, a neurosurgeon, an aviator and the first female member of the military to achieve the rank of General Officer, in 1976, as Physician General. In 1981, she was promoted to Inspector General of Medicine. A helicopter pilot, she is the first woman to have piloted a helicopter in a combat zone. She is also a founding member of the Académie de l'air et de l'espace.

As a member of the military, she is not addressed as "Madame la Générale" (a term reserved for spouses of generals) but as "General".

She started as a Medical Captain in Indochina in 1948, already a qualified parachutist and pilot, in addition to being an army surgeon.  While in Indochina, she realized that the most difficult part of her duties was retrieving the wounded, who were often trapped in the jungle.  She returned to France to learn how to pilot a helicopter, then flew one to Indochina.  From 1952–1953, she piloted 129 helicopter missions into the jungle, rescuing 165 soldiers, and on two occasions completed parachute jumps to treat wounded soldiers who needed immediate surgery.

One typical mission occurred on 11 December 1951, when casualties were in urgent need of evacuation from Tu Vu on the Black River. The only available helicopter, stationed near Saigon, was dismantled, flown to Hanoi by a Bristol Freighter and reassembled. Captain André then flew into Tu Vu despite heavy mist and anti-aircraft fire. There, she triaged the casualties, operated on the most pressing cases and then flew the urgent wounded back to Hanoi, two at a time. Later, she was put in command of a casualty evacuation flight.

She continued in Algeria as a Medical Commander in 1960, where she completed 365 war missions. She rose to the rank of Medical Lieutenant Colonel in 1965 then to Medical Colonel in 1970. She had a total of 3200 flight hours, and received 7 citations of the  Croix de Guerre.

She has written two collections of memoirs : Ici, Ventilateur! Extraits d'un carnet de vol. (Calmann-Lévy, 1954) and Madame le général (Perrin, 1988).

She is one of eight women to hold the Grand-croix (Great Cross) rank in the Legion of Honour, with Germaine Tillion, Geneviève de Gaulle-Anthonioz, Jacqueline de Romilly, Simone Rozès, Christiane Desroches Noblecourt, Yvette Farnoux et Gilberte Champion.
She is the aunt of politician André Santini.

She turned 100 on 21 April 2022.

Decorations
French
 Grand-croix of the Legion of Honour (19 December 1999); previously Chevalier on 25 February 1953
 Grand-croix of the Ordre National du Mérite in 1987, the first woman to receive this distinction.
 Croix de Guerre 1939-1945 with 7 citations.
 Croix de Guerre des Théâtres d'opérations extérieures
 Médaille de la Valeur Militaire
 Médaille commémorative d'Indochine,
 Médaille de l'Aéronautique
 Médaille du Combattant Volontaire (1944),
 Médaille de Vermeil du service de santé.
 Grande Médaille d'or du l'Aéro-club de France

Foreign decorations
 Legion of Merit (USA),
 National Order of Vietnam
 Cross of Valour (Canada)

References 

 https://timesmachine.nytimes.com/timesmachine/1952/08/10/83798288.html?pageNumber=4

External links 
 A brief article on the Website of l'INA
 A brief profile on the French Ministry of Defense Website

French generals
Female army generals
French Resistance members
1922 births
French centenarians
Military personnel from Strasbourg
Army aviation personnel
Grand Croix of the Légion d'honneur
Grand Cross of the Ordre national du Mérite
Recipients of the Croix de Guerre 1939–1945 (France)
Recipients of the Croix de guerre des théâtres d'opérations extérieures
Recipients of the Cross for Military Valour
Recipients of the Aeronautical Medal
Foreign recipients of the Legion of Merit
Recipients of the National Order of Vietnam
Living people
Helicopter pilots
French aviators
French women aviators
Physicians from Strasbourg
French memoirists
French women memoirists
20th-century French non-fiction writers
20th-century French women writers
French military personnel of the First Indochina War
Women centenarians

https://timesmachine.nytimes.com/timesmachine/1952/08/10/83798288.html?pageNumber=4